is a Japanese film director. He won the award for best new director at the 29th Yokohama Film Festival for Funuke Show Some Love, You Losers!.

Filmography
 Funuke Show Some Love, You Losers! (2007)
 Kuhio Taisa (2009)
 Permanent Nobara (2010)
 The Kirishima Thing (2012)
 Pale Moon (2014)
 A Beautiful Star (2017)
 The Scythian Lamb (2018)
 Kiba: The Fangs of Fiction (2021)

References

External links

1963 births
Living people
Japanese film directors
Japan Academy Prize for Director of the Year winners